Swaabhimaan is an Indian soap opera directed by Mahesh Bhatt and Debaloy Dey and was scripted by Shobha De and Vinod Ranganath.

Plot
Swaabhimaan divulges the story of an attractive woman - Svetlana - who finds herself in a battle where there are no real winners. Insecurity, suspicion and fear threaten to erode her vivacious spirit as she struggles to come to terms with her position - that of a pampered mistress whose tycoon patron Keshav Malhotra (Naasir Abdulah) dies leaving her to cope with the ugly aftermath of the tragedy: inheritance wars, succession rights, property entanglements, petty quarrels and above all, emotional turmoil that threatens to destroy her. This serial was aired from 1995 to 1997.

This was the first Indian TV show to complete 500 episodes. The show ended on the final episode, with most villains getting killed or being jailed.

Cast

References

External links
 

Indian television soap operas
DD National original programming
1994 Indian television series debuts
1997 Indian television series endings